The Pharaoh-seated, with flail & red crown hieroglyph is Gardiner sign listed no. A46, in the category of: man and his occupations; specifically, there are many varieties in the category showing the pharaoh. The King (Pharaoh) can typically wear a variety of headgear, so all varieties have interchangeable components and subsets. The pharaoh is shown sprouting a long, 'Puntite beard',<ref>Betrò, 1995. Hieroglyphics: The Writings of Ancient Egypt, p. 69.</ref> but can wear the Red Crown,S3 the White Crown, the Double Crown, the Blue or "War Crown", or something similar. He can also be holding a Crook, a Flail, S45 a Scepter, or other items.

Palermo Stone, King Series, Row I (predynastic)

The following is the list of predynastic pharaohs (Nile Delta north) represented on the Palermo Piece of the 7–piece Palermo Stone: The sequence is in the proper order with the beginning Pharaoh on the right: (reading right-to-left, seven complete names pictured in year-registers):

Mekh, Wazner, Neheb, Thesh, Tiu (Tiu), Khayu, Hsekiu.

.G17:F32.M13:K5.N35:U14.V13:N39..X1*M17:G43..L6:E9.S29:D28

.A46.A46.A46.A46.A46.A46.A46.A46

Owl...Papyrus...Ripple......Tether...Bread&Feather.Bivalve...Cloth
Belly.....Fish......Plow........Lake.............Quail.........Newborn...Ka

Note: On the Palermo Stone all the hieroglyphs face in the other direction (Gardiner signs are only facing left, on the stone they face right (reading right-to-left)). The source of the following Pharaohs is only from this King List; a few have artifacts that further confirm their reign (the Double Falcon King). The pharaohs deficient in information are: Hsekiu, Khayu, Tiu (pharaoh), Thesh, Neheb, Wazner, Mekh.

See also

Gardiner's Sign List#A. Man and his occupations
List of Egyptian hieroglyphs

References

Betrò, 1995. Hieroglyphics: The Writings of Ancient Egypt, Betrò, Maria Carmela, c. 1995, 1996-(English), Abbeville Press Publishers, New York, London, Paris (hardcover)
Budge.  An Egyptian Hieroglyphic Dictionary,'' E.A.Wallace Budge, (Dover Publications), c 1978, (c 1920), Dover edition, 1978. (In two volumes, 1314 pp. and cliv-(154) pp.) (softcover)

Egyptian hieroglyphs: man and his occupations